Acanthogonatus chilechico is a mygalomorph spider of Chile, its name arising from its type locality: Chile Chico, General Carrera, Region XI (de Aysén), Chile. This species is most similar to A. notatus, but is distinguished by a less developed embolar flange and by having the basal portion of the bulb narrower in lateral view, and the presence of more numerous spines on its metatarsus I.

Description
Male: total length ; cephalothorax length , width ; cephalic region length , width ; medial ocular quadrangle , width ; labium length , width ; sternum length , width . Its labium has no cuspules. A serrula is present on the anterior edge only. Its sternal sigilla is small, oval and submarginal; it possesses a weakly rebordered sternum. Chelicerae: rastellum is formed by attenuate setae; its 6 teeth are widely spaced. Cheliceral tumescence is white and flat. Its metatarsus is almost straight. The entire spider is yellowish-brown in colour, while its abdomen has darker spots, forming a chevron.

Distribution
It is known to habitate only in the type locality.

References

External links

 ADW entry

ZipcodeZoo entry

Pycnothelidae
Spiders of South America
Spiders described in 1995
Endemic fauna of Chile